Center Township is a township in Dickinson County, Kansas, USA.  As of the 2000 census, its population was 1,210.

Geography
According to the USGS, it contains one cemetery, Mount Hope.

Terrapin Lake is within this township. The stream of Lone Tree Creek runs through this township.

Transportation
Center Township contains two airports or landing strips: Academy Airport and Prichard Airstrip.

Further reading

References

 USGS Geographic Names Information System (GNIS)

External links
 City-Data.com

Townships in Dickinson County, Kansas
Townships in Kansas